Zhang Wei (born October 1, 1981), also known under the pen name Tang Jia San Shao (唐家三少), is a Chinese online novelist. He is the author of the epic fantasy series Douluo Dalu, also known as Soul Land. It was adapted into the Tencent Penguin Pictures TV series Douluo Dalu (2020), network animation Douluo Dalu (2018–present), as well as comics, online games and mobile games. Most of his other series of fantasy novels are shared universe with Douluo Dalu.

Tang Jia San Shao is one of the representative figures of Chinese online novelists. He has created 24 novels with thousands of copies in print and a total of more than 70 million words since 2004.

Zhang has been listed by some sources as one of China’s top-earning online novelists (2012-2017). In 2015, he was included in Forbes list of Chinese celebrities.

Biography 
In 1998, Zhang worked for CCTV after he graduated college and started to get exposure in online novels such as The First Intimate Contact. In 2003, Zhang became a contract writer for Qidian,which is a literature website of China Literature Limited and China's leading website for original literature. In February 2004, Zhang started his writing career and released his first online novel, Child of Light, while working as a website engineer in a small IT company. When Zhang first started writing, he could only release 2,000 to 3,000 words (Chinese characters) per day. This then rose to about 7,000 to 8,000 words a day, with Zhang currently writing 15,000 to 16,000 words on his most productive days.

In 2005, Zhang released Mad God, The Kind Death God and I am the Sole Immortal, with a total of 4 million words, this is also one of the most abundant year of his creation record.

On December 30, 2013, Zhang established the Tang Studio, which is the first online writer studio in China, with the purpose of realizing the full copyright operating model.

In April 2016, Zhang established the Xuanshi Tangmen Culture Media Co., Ltd.

Pseudonym 
In March 2013, in the show Day Day Up, Zhang explained that his pen name comes from the fact that he liked to add three small spoons of sugar to his soya bean milk, which is Sugar Added Three Spoons (糖加三勺) and Tang Jia San Shao (唐家三少) being a homonym of Chinese pronunciation.

In 2015, in Zhang's autobiographical novel For You, I'm Willing to Love the World, he interprets his pen name comes from one of his four online chatting room usernames on earlier life. In 2018, in the show The Reader, Zhang also gave the same explanation.

Marriage 
Zhang Wei married his wife Li Mo in May 2007.

In July 2018, in the monthly released physical-book, chapter of postscript in Douluo Dalu 3: Legend of the Dragon King 28, Zhang described the anti-cancer process and life of him and his wife since Li was diagnosed with breast cancer in 2015. The same version was released online officially in Qidian on August 24, 2018.

On September 11, 2018, in a Weibo post, Zhang announced Li died after battling breast cancer for three years.

On September 15, 2018, in Zhang's WeChat public account and Weibo post, he announced that he would not be updating daily in order to accompany with Li. In a Weibo post, Alibaba announced have to fired an editor and a writer from publishing arm of Alibaba Group for insulting Li in a private messaging group.

Activities 
In May 2018, Zhang was invited to participate in the 2018 Iqiyi World Conference Network Literature Summit Forum.

On November 26, 2020, Zhang joined the annual Tengyun Summit to explore the relationship between technology and culture.

Portfolio

External links 

 Tang Jia San Shao on Qidian
 Tang Jia San Shao on Sina Weibo (in Chinese) (registration required)
 Tang Jia San Shao on Wuxiaworld
 Tang Jia San Shao on The Readers (in Chinese)
 Tang Jia San Shao on China Literature Limited's Ceremony (in Chinese)

References 

Writers from Beijing
1981 births
Living people
Hebei University alumni